TVR Timișoara is one of the six regional branches of Societatea Română de Televiziune (Romanian Television Company). On air since 17 October 1994 from a studio in Cluj, which was built in 1990 and from one in Iași that began broadcasting in 1991. Its initial airing schedule had a weekly duration of 35 minutes, whereas by 2004 the time on air was over 1200 minutes per week. From 1997 to 2004, Brindusa Armanca managed the station.

References

External links
 TVR

Timisoara
Mass media in Timișoara
Television channels and stations established in 1994
Television stations in Romania